Belauli is a village in the Mehdawal tehsil of Sant Kabir Nagar district, Uttar Pradesh state, India.

Geography 
Belauli is situated about 17 km from the town of Mehdawal. It is on the eastern side of the Sant Kabir Nagar district, on the western border of Gorakhpur district. The village is approximately 30 km from the city of Gorakhpur.

The river Rapti flows through the village. The people of Belauli have been affected many times by the flood caused by the Rapti river.

Notable people 
 Nagendra Nath Tripathi, politician

See also 
 Sant Kabir
 Mehdawal
 Sant Kabir Nagar district
 Gorakhpur district

References 

Villages in Sant Kabir Nagar district